Sosylus is a genus of dry bark beetles in the family Bothrideridae. There are about eight described species in Sosylus.

Species
These eight species belong to the genus Sosylus:
 Sosylus castaneus Pascoe, 1863
 Sosylus chapini Hinton
 Sosylus costatus LeConte, 1863
 Sosylus dentiger Horn, 1878
 Sosylus extensus Casey, 1897
 Sosylus latisnus Hinton
 Sosylus nevermanni Hinton
 Sosylus striolatus (Grouvelle, 1914)

References

Further reading

 
 

Bothrideridae
Articles created by Qbugbot
Coccinelloidea genera